Daniel G. Albert (September 14, 1901 – August 14, 1983) was an American lawyer and politician from New York.

Life
He was born on September 14, 1901, in Brooklyn, New York City. The family removed to Ellenville, Ulster County, New York, when Daniel was eight years old. He married Sally, and they had two daughters.
Later he practiced law in Rockville Centre.

Albert was a member of the New York State Senate (2nd D.) from 1956 to 1962, sitting in the 170th, 171st, 172nd and 173rd New York State Legislatures. In November 1962, he was elected to the New York Supreme Court.

He was a justice of the Supreme Court (10th D.) from 1963 to 1977.

He died on August 14, 1983, and was buried at the New Montefiore Cemetery in West Babylon.

Sources

External links

1901 births
1983 deaths
Politicians from Brooklyn
Republican Party New York (state) state senators
New York Supreme Court Justices
People from Ellenville, New York
20th-century American judges
20th-century American politicians